Parliamentary elections were held in Estonia on 2 March 2003. The newly elected 101 members of the 10th Riigikogu assembled at Toompea Castle in Tallinn within ten days of the election. Two opposing parties won the most seats, with both the Centre Party and Res Publica Party winning 28 seats in the Riigikogu. Res Publica was able to gain enough support in negotiations after the elections to form a coalition government.

Background
Before the elections the government of Estonia was a coalition of the centre-right Estonian Reform Party and the more left-wing Centre Party, with Siim Kallas from the Reform Party of Estonia as prime minister. On 26 November 2002 the President of Estonia, Arnold Rüütel, set 2 March 2003 as the election date. 947 candidates from 11 political parties contested the election as well as 16 independents.

Campaign
Opinion polls showed the Centre Party led by the mayor of Tallinn, Edgar Savisaar, with a small lead in the run up to the election. They were expected to gain support from among those who had not benefited from the rapid economic reforms that had taken place over the last decade. However their populism and their lack of a clear policy on whether Estonia should join the European Union meant they were likely to struggle to form a coalition after the election.

The leading critics of the Centre Party were from the new conservative Res Publica Party, which had only been formed in 2002. Res Publica's campaign focused on the need to address crime and corruption and they portrayed themselves as being a change to the older political parties. Res Publica had performed strongly in the 2002 local elections after being formed from the youth wings of some of the other right wing political parties.

A leading issue in the election was the tax system with the Centre Party pledging to scrap the flat tax and change it to a progressive tax system. Both Res Publica and the Reform Party opposed this, with the Reform Party calling for the tax rate to be cut significantly. The personalities of the various party leaders were also a significant part of the campaign, with opponents particularly attacked the Centre Party leader Edgar Savisaar. Savisaar had quit as interior minister in 1995 after being accused of taping rival politicians and during the campaign the media raised questions over the financing of his campaign.

Results
The results saw the Centre Party win the most votes but they were only 0.8% ahead of the new Res Publica party. As a result, both parties won 28 seats, which was a disappointment for the Centre Party who had expected to win the most seats. Altogether the right of centre parties won 60 seats, compared to only 41 for the left wing, and so were expected to form the next government. Voter turnout was higher than expected at 58%. The Russian minority parties lost representation in parliament, with most of such voter switching to Estonian parties of the left (Estonian Centre Party) or some to the non-nationalist right (Reform Party).

Aftermath
Both the Centre and Res Publica parties said that they should get the chance to try and form the next government, while ruling out any deal between themselves. President Rüütel had to decide who he should nominate as Prime Minister and therefore be given the first chance at forming a government. On the 2 April he invited the leader of the Res Publica party, Juhan Parts to form a government and after negotiations a coalition government composed of Res Publica, the Reform Party and the People's Union of Estonia was formed on the 10 April.

References

External links
Estonian Electoral Commission

2003
Estonia
2003 in Estonia
March 2003 events in Europe